The 2002 UC Santa Barbara Gauchos men's soccer team represented the University of California, Santa Barbara during the 2002 NCAA Division I men's soccer season. The UC Santa Barbara Gauchos were led by head coach Tim Vom Steeg, in his fourth season. For the first time in program history, the team became nationally ranked during the season and made the NCAA Tournament, advancing to the second round.

Background 
The UC Santa Barbara Gauchos men's soccer team won the 2001 Big West Conference championship, however the conference did not have an automatic bid to the 2001 NCAA Division I Men's Soccer Tournament as the conference had just reinstated the men's soccer competition for the first time since 1991. The team did not receive an at-large selection by the NCAA which ended their 2001 season.

Season summary 
The 2002 UC Santa Barbara men's soccer team was tabbed as preseason favorites to win the league in the annual Big West Conference coaches poll, besting the UC Irvine Anteaters by one point. With no exhibition games to start the season, the Gauchos won the Michigan State Classic. After their next game against St. Mary's, the Gauchos were nationally ranked by College Soccer News for their first time in program history. Their unbeaten streak continued through the St. Louis Nike Classic, and Bryant & Sons Cup. Shortly after, the NSCAA/adidas, Soccer America, and Soccer Times all joined College Soccer News in adding UC Santa Barbara to their top-25 teams. Their first loss wouldn't come until October 6th against #7 Loyola Marymount. The Gauchos went unbeaten in Big West Conference play, including both games of the Blue–Green Rivalry against the Cal Poly Mustangs. The only other regular season loss the Gauchos experienced was to #1 Indiana Hoosiers.

The Gauchos claimed a share of the Big West Conference championship on November 9th after a 3–0 victory against the UC Riverside Highlanders. The Gauchos defeated the Cal State Fullerton Titans the following game 2–0 to claim the title outright. UC Santa Barbara earned an at-large bid to the 2002 NCAA Division I Men's Soccer Tournament and hosted the San Diego Toreros at Harder Stadium. The Gauchos won the match 2–0, but fell in the following round to the California Golden Bears.

Player movement

Offseason departures 
Sources:

Recruiting 
The signing class was formally announced on May 16, 2002. A further signing was announced on July 9, 2002.

Transfers 
Outgoing

Incoming

Personnel

Player roster 
Final 2002 roster.

Coaches

Schedule 
Source: 

|-
!colspan=6 style=""| Regular Season

|-
!colspan=6 style=""| NCAA Tournament

Awards and honors

Rankings

References

External links 
 2002 UC Santa Barbara Gauchos men's soccer news

UC Santa Barbara Gauchos men's soccer seasons
2002 UC Santa Barbara Gauchos
UC Santa Barbara Gauchos men's soccer team
UC Santa Barbara Gauchos
UC Santa Barbara Gauchos